Sylvain Moniquet (born 14 January 1998 in Namur) is a Belgian cyclist, who currently rides for UCI WorldTeam .

Major results
2016
 6th Overall Giro di Basilicata
2018
 4th Overall Tour du Jura Cycliste
2019
 1st  Overall Triptyque Ardennais
1st Stage 3
 4th Overall Tour de Liège
 6th Overall Grand Prix Priessnitz spa
2020
 4th Piccolo Giro di Lombardia
 7th Overall Ronde de l'Isard
 8th Overall Tour de Savoie Mont-Blanc
2022
 7th Overall Deutschland Tour
 8th Classic Grand Besançon Doubs

Grand Tour general classification results timeline

References

External links

1998 births
Living people
Belgian male cyclists
Sportspeople from Namur (city)
Cyclists from Namur (province)
21st-century Belgian people